Lalit Mohan Sharma (12 February 1928 – 3 November 2008) was the 24th Chief Justice of India. He was the son of L.N. Sinha, former Attorney General of India. He served as Chief Justice of India from 18 November 1992 until 11 February 1993.

Legal career
Passed B.A. Hons. (Patna University ) in 1946. Passed B.L. (Patna University) in 1948. Enrolled as articled clerk in High Court, Patna in 1949. Started practice in High Court, Patna as an Advocate – 6 Feb. 1950. Enrolled as Supreme Court Advocate – 6 March 1957. Later nominated as Senior Advocate. Took charge (oath) as Judge, Patna High Court on 12 April 1973.

He joined the Supreme Court of India on 5 October 1987 and appointed as Chief Justice of India on 18 November 1992.

He retired from the judicial service on 11 Feb. 1993.

Family and early life
Lalit Mohan Sharma was born on 12 February 1928 in the village of Musi (Belaganj, Gaya, Bihar) in a zameendar family. His father, Lal Narayan Sinha, was the Attorney General of India during the Prime Minister-ship of Indira Gandhi and Solicitor General of India from 17 July 1972 until 5 April 1977. His son, Justice Parthasarthy currently serves as a Judge in the Patna High Court.

Death

Sharma died on 3 November 2008 in Patna at his residence following a long illness. He was 80 years old. He is survived by his wife, son and daughter.

References

External links
 Biography

1928 births
2008 deaths
Chief justices of India
Bihari politicians
Patna University alumni
Politicians from Patna
20th-century Indian lawyers
People from Gaya, India
20th-century Indian judges